Im Hero is the debut studio album by South Korean singer Lim Young-woong, released on May 2, 2022, through Mulgogi Music and distributed by Dreamus. It was preceded by the single "Our Blues, Our Life", which topped the Gaon Digital Chart on release, and accompanied by the second single "If We Ever Meet Again", which also debuted atop the Gaon Digital Chart.

The album was released in four physical versions and debuted atop the Gaon Album Chart upon release. According to Gaon, Im Hero sold over 772,000 copies in South Korea in its first week of retail availability. It won Album of the Year at the 2022 Melon Music Awards.

Background
Im Hero, Lim's first album, comes six years after his debut. He stated that he "did [his] best to put in a wide variety of songs" and "really wanted to get it right. Just when I thought I'd completed it, something would make me think it's not enough, and I'd go back to the beginning on several occasions."

Commercial performance
The album became available for pre-order on April 7, 2022, and its jewel case version sold out quickly. The album debuted atop the Gaon Album Chart and sold over 772,000 copies at retail stores in South Korea in its first week of availability, according to Gaon. According to Hanteo, Lim broke the record for first-day CD sales by a solo singer, selling 940,600 copies on its first day and over 1.1 million in total in its first week.

Accolades

Track listing

Charts

Weekly charts

Monthly charts

Year-end charts

References

2022 debut albums
Korean-language albums